Gilla na Naem Ó Conmaigh, Irish musician, died 1360. 

The Annals of the Four Masters, sub anno 1360, record the death of Gilla-na-naev O'Conmhaigh, Chief Professor of Music in Thomond. 

This indicates that Ó Conmaigh was considered the pre-eminent musician and/or musical tutor in Thomond at the time of his death. 

The surname is now generally rendered as Conway.

References
 Music and musicians in medieval Irish society, Ann Buckley, pp. 165–190, Early Music xxviii, no.2, May 2000
 Music in Prehistoric and Medieval Ireland, Ann Buckley, pp. 744–813, in A New History of Ireland, volume one, Oxford, 2005.

External links
http://celt.ucc.ie/publishd.html
http://www.irishtimes.com/ancestor/surname/index.cfm?fuseaction=Go.&UserID=

Medieval Gaels from Ireland
14th-century Irish musicians
Musicians from County Clare
1360 deaths
Year of birth unknown